Raffles University, Neemrana established by an Act of Rajasthan State Legislative named Raffles University Neemrana Act 2011 and is recognised as per Section 2(f) of the UGC Act  is a multidisciplinary University. Raffles University is situated in NCR region, at Neemrana.

Sponsoring body 
Gomber Education Foundation, a voluntary, non-profit making, non-sectarian charitable organisation registered under the Indian Trusts Act, 1882 founded by Late Shri Vinod Kumar Gomber with trustees, is the sponsoring body of Raffles University.

Courses Offered 
It offers BBA, MBA, B.Com., M.Com., B.Tech., M.Tech., B.Sc. (Agriculture), graduate, post-graduate and degree programmes in Law (5 years integrated and 3 years degree), LLM (one year); Management (including rural management), Humanities (including Civil Service preparation), Commerce, Applied Science, Engineering and Technology, Pharmacy (diploma and degree both).

National Academic Collaborations

National Maritime Foundation
Raffles University's Centre for Maritime Studies and NMF, the sole think tank undert the Ministry of Defence, Government of India, have a university outreach programme to enhance maritime awareness and its need in the present day trade and to develop schemes leading to skill development and job creations within the maritime domain.

Central Institute of Technology, Kokrajhar

There is an academic collaboration between Raffles University and Central Institute of Technology, Kokrajhar, a centrally funded University under the Ministry of Human Resource Development (MHRD), Government of India for the purpose of joint research, conferences, seminars, capacity building workshops in the area of Applied Sciences, Engineering and Technology, Food Agriculture, Pharmacy, besides the faculty student exchange programmes and internship placement support to each other.

International Academic Collaborations

Lisbon University
 
The School of Law, Raffles University and Faculty of Law of University of Lisbon, Portugal are in collaboration since 2013 for the purpose of students and faculty exchange programme.

University of New Hampshire
 
The Intellectual Property Center of Raffles School of Law and The Franklin Pierce Center for Intellectual Property of University of New Hampshire have been in collaboration since 2012 to conduct competitions to promote study and research in the field of Intellectual Property in India as their sole representative. T

Admission 
Admission to undergraduate and postgraduate programs at Raffles University, Neemrana are open from March onwards, every year. Applications are invited which are reviewed for eligibility, academic performance, and other evidence of the candidate's eligibility to their preferred programme. For admission to Ph.D. Program, a separate admission test is conducted which comprises written exam and presentation to the Doctoral Research Committee.

References

Private universities in India
Universities in Rajasthan
Neemrana
Educational institutions established in 2011
2011 establishments in Rajasthan
Education in Alwar district